Vadym Kolesnyk (born 12 March 1967 in Chudniv, Ukrainian SSR) is a former Ukrainian football striker and current football coach.

Career
He started out at a sports school and his first coach was his father Leonid Kolesnyk. Vadym Kolesnyk graduated from the Sumy State Pedagogical University of Makarenko. He has a son, Vladyslav (b.1997).

Currently he is the assistant coach of FC Naftovyk-Ukrnafta Okhtyrka in the Ukrainian First League.

Coaching career
After he retired from playing football in 2003, he was invited to work as an assistant coach in 2003.

On 5 November 2011, Kolesnyk became the new interim head coach of FC Naftovyk-Ukrnafta Okhtyrka in the Ukrainian First League.

References

External links

Biography. 2 May 2006.

1967 births
Living people
Ukrainian footballers
Soviet footballers
Ukrainian football managers
Ukrainian expatriate footballers
Expatriate footballers in Israel
Ukrainian expatriate sportspeople in Israel
FC Naftovyk-Ukrnafta Okhtyrka players
FC Metalist Kharkiv players
FC Karpaty Lviv players
FC Karpaty-2 Lviv players
FC Mariupol players
Hapoel Kfar Saba F.C. players
FC Elektron Romny players
FC Shakhtar Makiivka players
FC Naftovyk Okhtyrka managers
People from Chudniv
Association football forwards
Sportspeople from Zhytomyr Oblast